Matheny may refer to:

Places
Matheny, California, a census-designated place
Matheny, West Virginia, an unincorporated community

Other uses
Matheny (surname)

See also
Metheny